Craig Linton Estes (born August 20, 1953) is an American businessman and former Republican  member of the Texas Senate for the 30th District. 
  
He served on the Health and Human Services, Nominations, and State Affairs Committees, and was the chairman of the Natural Resources & Economic Development Committee.
He also served as the President Pro Tempore of the Texas Senate for the 83rd interim session.

Estes was defeated by challenger Pat Fallon in the Republican primary election held on March 6, 2018.

Electoral history
Senate election history of Estes.

2012

2008

2004

2002

2001

References

External links
Senate of Texas - Senator Craig Estes official TX Senate website
Senator Craig Estes 'official website
Project Vote Smart - Senator Craig Estes (TX) profileFollow the Money'' - Craig L. Estes
2006 2004 2002 campaign contributions

1953 births
Living people
Oral Roberts University alumni
Republican Party Texas state senators
Presidents pro tempore of the Texas Senate
21st-century American politicians
People from Wichita Falls, Texas